John Cirby Sturtevant (February 20, 1835 – December 20, 1912) was a Republican member of the U.S. House of Representatives from Pennsylvania.

John C. Sturtevant was born in Spring Township, Crawford County, Pennsylvania.  He attended the common schools and engaged in teaching and farming.  He was an officer in the Pennsylvania State House of Representatives at Harrisburg, Pennsylvania, in 1861, 1862, and 1864.  He was a delegate to seven Republican State conventions from 1865 to 1890.  He was a member of the State House of Representatives in 1865 and in 1866.  He moved to Conneautville, Pennsylvania, in 1867.  He was engaged in the hardware business until 1873, and in manufacturing and milling until 1888.  He also engaged in banking, serving as cashier and president of the First National Bank of Conneautville.

Sturtevant was elected as a Republican to the Fifty-fifth Congress .  He was not a candidate for renomination in 1898.  He resumed his banking interests, and was a delegate to the 1908 Republican National Convention.  He died in Conneautville in 1912.  Interment in Conneautville Cemetery.

Sources

The Political Graveyard

1835 births
1912 deaths
People from Crawford County, Pennsylvania
Republican Party members of the Pennsylvania House of Representatives
Republican Party members of the United States House of Representatives from Pennsylvania
19th-century American politicians